Karl Kani (born Carl Williams on May 23, 1968 in Limon, Costa Rica) is an American  fashion designer, founder and CEO of the hip hop fashion brand Karl Kani. He comes from a modest family from Brooklyn, New York. When he was young, he dreamed of combining his passion for hip hop music and fashion.

History

Early life
Carl Williams was born in Costa Rica to a Panamanian father and Costa Rican mother. The family migrated to the United States in the late 1960s, and he grew up in the Flatbush, Brooklyn.

Early career
At age 16, Williams started designing clothes after learning the essential handcraft at his father's company. He never studied tailoring or design, but he had flair for coming up with unusual concepts. He would buy material and tell a tailor exactly how he wanted his garments to look. "For a relatively small sum", as he put it, "I had a fresh outfit that nobody had."

After seeing him on the scene in local clubs, men started asking for a Carl Williams outfit of their own. Soon he was taking his first orders in his car. The death of one of his close friends inspired some deep contemplation. "It made me think about life differently", he added " I thought I should really do something positive."

In 1989 he went to Los Angeles, where he and a friend opened a clothing shop on Crenshaw Boulevard. They made no profit at this location, and after the shop was robbed, they moved to Hollywood, where he started selling catalogs for $2 that he and his partner had put together. They only made profit from the catalog sales and did not sell any clothes. He decided to take out an advertisement in Right On! Magazine, but that did not jumpstart sales.

Brand name
Carl Williams symbolizes the “American Dream”. During Williams's rough start in Los Angeles, the question that had obsessed him for years, "Can I do it?", remained unanswered. He kept asking himself: "Can I do it? Can I build a fashion empire? Can I become the 'Ralph Lauren of the streets'?" He didn't have the answer for these questions, but it did provide the basis for his new name, Kani, a variation on "Can I?". These questions provided the basis for his brandname, Kani, a variation on "Can I?". Karl replaced the “C” with a stylish “K” and ventured his own optimistic reply, Karl Kani.

In 1989 Karl Kani was launched as a hip hop fashion brand. He was inspired by his passion for hip hop music and fashion and decided to design clothes that appealed to a large public, including friends and celebrities from his hometown Brooklyn, New York.

Karl Kani Infinity
After watching The Today Show, Kani had the idea of paying a friend in New York to make a sign with his label's name on it and hold it up during the taping of the show. The idea worked as people started calling and orders began to come in.

In addition to working with a mainstream color selection, Kani modified the baggy pants that had become the basis of street fashion. According to him, black people never liked tight-fitting jeans. They would always buy a bigger size but then the waist would be too big, so he decided to increase the pant size.
 
In 1994, Kani used $500,000 in profits to launch his company "Karl Kani Infinity". In addition to his old partners, Kani now faced a marketing onslaught from hip-hop entrepreneur Russell Simmons's Phat Farm and a number of mainstream clothiers. He also had reason to worry that his involvement in Cross Colours might taint his operation in the minds of retailers. "I expected some resistance," Kani said. "A major turning point for me was when retailers accepted us back into the market."

Staying ahead of fashion counterfeiters who aped his signature and sold cheaper versions of his clothes, Kani began fastening a metal-and-leather plate to his product. After some resistance from the people who made the plates, Kani decided to go ahead with it and it turned out to be his best-selling jeans ever.

A sister brand, Kani Ladies, was launched in 2001.

Karl Kani Big & Tall
The idea for the big & tall line came to Kani after numerous conversations with National Basketball Association stars, who complained that they could not fit into much of his merchandise. Big and tall people may be just as fashion-conscious as anyone else, so Kani launched his line in mid-1995 in big & tall stores around the country.

Kani Ladies
Kani Ladies is a fashion label for young women launched in 2001 as a sister of the brand Karl Kani. Kani Ladies started with a small urban collection next to the men’s collection and was sold in the same stores as Karl Kani. In the following years, Kani Ladies evolved into an independent street fashion label for young women. Kani Ladies offers a wide range of jeans, dresses, shorts, tops and more. Besides clothing, the brand also includes jewelry, bags and shoes. In 1998 Kani Ladies launched its first European collection. What started as a small collection next to the Karl Kani men collection has since evolved into an independent fashion label. Kani Ladies is sold in selected stores in Europe. With the slogan “Kani Ladies, for every moment in your glamorous life" Kani Ladies inspires young women. The clothing appealed to urban women who enjoy sexy fashion and love Hip Hop music.

In 2008 Kani Ladies has officially launched a lifestyle blog. The blog features news on fashion, beauty, gossip, music, well being and Kani Ladies.

Street Fashion Brand
Since its start the brand has crossed over to street fashion. Today Kani Ladies is an independent fashion brand that represents the glamorous girl next door. The brand has been featured in fashion magazines like Cosmogirl, Elle Girl and Glamour and TV shows like Idols. Kani Ladies has broadened its target group to young women who enjoy fashion and want their clothes to reflect their personality.

Legacy
He began a trend of merging hip hop with fashion. He spotted an area in the market that had been ignored and paved the way for other hip hop fashion brands. He was the fashion choice of rap superstar Tupac Shakur who in 1994 did a campaign for the fashion label and did not charge for his time.

Awards
Black Enterprise magazine named Karl Kani Infinity Corporation the most successful Black owned firm worldwide in 1996.

In 2002 Kani was honored with an Urban Fashion Pioneer Award for his lifetime achievements, at the Urban Fashion Awards.

References

External links
 Karl Kani official website
 Kani Ladies' Official Website

Clothing brands
American fashion designers
Costa Rican emigrants to the United States
American people of Panamanian descent
Companies established in 1989
Suit makers
1968 births
Living people
Hip hop fashion